Motel is a river of Mecklenburg-Vorpommern, Germany. It is a left tributary of the Schilde, which it joins in Camin.

See also
List of rivers of Mecklenburg-Vorpommern

Rivers of Mecklenburg-Western Pomerania
Rivers of Germany